Marijampolė Rygiškių Jonas Gymnasium is a secondary school in Marijampolė, Lithuania. It is named after Rygiškių Jonas, one of the pen names of linguist Jonas Jablonskis who was one of the gymnasium's alumni. Established in 1867, the gymnasium was a significant cultural center of Suvalkija and educated many prominent figures of the Lithuanian National Revival. Since 2010, it is a four-year school (9–12th years of secondary education).

History

The school traces its roots to 1840 when a four-year school was moved from Sejny to Marijampolė which was then part of the Suwałki Governorate, Congress Poland. The school was geared towards children of Polish nobles and was known far its anti-Lithuanian bias. After the Uprising of 1863, Tsarist authorities decided to implement various Russification policies, including the Lithuanian press ban and de-Polonization of schools. That meant that children of Lithuanian farmers were encouraged to attend the school in Marijampolė, which in 1867 was converted into a seven-year gymnasium. The Tsarist authorities also established ten annual scholarships of 360 rubles for children of Lithuanian farmers who graduated from Marijampolė and Suwałki Gymnasiums to study at Moscow and Saint Petersburg Universities. In 1870, a dedicated two-storey brick building was erected.

During World War I, the gymnasium was evacuated to Yaroslavl until 1918. The gymnasium was reestablished in independent Lithuania and was known as one of the best schools in the country. In 1920 it was named after one of the pen names of Jonas Jablonskis. Its director Kazys Jokantas became Minister of Education (1925–1926) and teacher Vincas Vilkaitis became rector of Lithuanian Agricultural Academy (1934–1940). During the times of the Lithuanian SSR, the gymnasium was reorganized into an ordinary twelve-year secondary school. The gymnasium regained its historical name in 1996.

A school museum was established in 1967, on the 100th anniversary of the gymnasium. In 2011, it had about 7,000 exhibits. In 2002, Memorial Museum of Vincas Mykolaitis-Putinas was moved to the gymnasium.

Names
The gymnasium was known by various names under different regimes:

Marijampolė Men Gymnasium, Marijampolė State Rygiškių Jonas Gymnasium, Marijampolė 1st Gymnasium, Kapsukas 1st secondary school, Kapsukas Jono Jablonskis secondary school, Marijampolė Rygiškių Jonas secondary school.

Prominent alumni
Many prominent figures in Lithuanian politics, culture, and education graduated from Marijampolė Gymnasium. Among them were:
 Juozas Adomaitis-Šernas (1859–1922), writer
 Zigmas Angarietis (1882–1940), communist
 Saliamonas Banaitis (1866–1933), educator, banker
 Jonas Basanavičius (1851–1927), patriarch of the Lithuanian nation
 Kazys Boruta (1905–1965), writer
 Pranas Dovydaitis (1886–1942), politician, professor
 Algirdas Julien Greimas (1917–1992), linguist
 Kazys Grinius (1866–1950), President of Lithuania
 Jonas Jablonskis (1860–1930), linguist
 Petras Klimas (1891–1969), diplomat
 Vincas Kudirka (1858–1898), writer
 Jurgis Matulaitis-Matulevičius (1871–1927), bishop
 Vincas Mickevičius-Kapsukas (1880–1935), communist
 Vincas Mykolaitis-Putinas (1893–1967), writer
 Salomėja Nėris (1904–1945), poet
 Justinas Staugaitis (1866–1943), bishop
 Matas Šalčius (1890–1940), traveler, journalist
 Antanas Venclova (1906–1971), Soviet politician, writer
 Angelė Vyšniauskaitė (1919–2006), ethnologist, professor

References

Educational institutions established in 1867
Buildings and structures in Marijampolė
Secondary schools in Lithuania
1867 establishments in the Russian Empire
History of education in Lithuania